Numto is a freshwater lake in Khanty-Mansi Autonomous Okrug, Russia. 

The village of Numto, part of the Kazym rural settlement, is located at the southwestern of the lake by its shore. Historically it was the place where the Kazym rebellion flared up in the early 1930s.

Oil and gas exploration controversy
Numto is a traditional sacred site for the local Khanty people. The lake is part of an integrated  protected area which was established in 1997 in Beloyarsky District and which is complemented by the Numto Natural Park in adjacent Nadymsky District of Yamalo-Nenets Autonomous Okrug to the north. The area, however is under threat from oil and gas drilling operations.

Geography
Numto is a lake of thermokarst origin located in an area of numerous smaller lakes of the Siberian Uvaly. It has a roughly semicircular shape. There is a small heart-shaped island near the western end of the lake that is a sacred place in local shamanism. 

The lake is located in the Beloyarsky District, at the northern limit of the Khanty-Mansi Autonomous Okrug, near the border of Yamalo-Nenets Autonomous Okrug. The area of the lake is covered with sparse larch taiga and swamps.

See also
Association to Save Yugra
List of lakes of Russia
Petroleum exploration in the Arctic

References

External links
Greenpeace - Indigenous Ritual near Numto Lake in Siberia
Numto - EthnoMir

Geography of Khanty-Mansi Autonomous Okrug
Lakes of Russia
Sacred lakes
West Siberian Plain